Thottilpalam is the second major town (after  kuttiady) in north east of Kozhikode district, Kerala.State Highway 54 to Wayanadu district passes through this town. It is 29 km from Vatakara and 5 km from  kuttiady. Thottilpalam is the main town in Kavilumpara panchayath. Town is situated at the bottom of kuttiady churam. Arjuna Award winner Tom Joseph is from Thottilpalam.

Etymology

The term Thottil  has the meaning cradle and the term Palam means bridge in Malayalam. According to local tradition there was a cradle shaped bridge built across the Kuttiady River, by the British East India Company, to move their goods easily from the Estate in Kunduthode to the Tellichery.

Economy
Thottilpalam is one of the major agricultural areas in Kozhikode district. The main cash crops are: Cloves(Grambu) Nutmeg, coconut, areca nut, ginger, turmeric, and pepper. So this area is called as Malayoram. As Thottilpalam is the foot hills of Malayoram,. Many others are engaged in business and other jobs. Hotels, Restaurants, Petrol pumps, ATM's, Hospitals, Banks, Police Station and other major offices are located in town.
And a vanitha co-operative society is there in economy sector at thottilpalam.

See also
 Vatakara
 Nadapuram
 Perambra
 Madappally
 Villiappally
 Memunda
 Iringal
 Mahe, Pondicherry
 Payyoli
 Thikkodi
 orkkatteri
 Chathangottunada

References

Kuttiady area